The following is a list of unmanned aerial vehicles developed and operated in various countries around the world.

Algeria

 AL fajer L-10
 Amel (UAV)

Argentina

 AeroDreams Chi-7 (AeroDreams)
 AeroDreams Strix Reconnaissance (2006)
 AeroVision Arcangel (AeroVision) - agricultural and civilian surveillance (2010)
 FMA IA X 59 Dronner (FAdeA) - reconnaissance (1972)
 Lipán M3 "Apache" - reconnaissance (2007)
 Lipán XM4 - reconnaissance (development)
 ARA Guardian (UAV) - reconnaissance (2007)
 Nostromo Caburé (Nostromo Defensa)
 Nostromo Centinela
 Nostromo Yarará
 Nostromo Yagua
 Quimar MQ-2 "Bigua"

Armenia

 Krunk UAV
 X-55 (UAV)

Australia

 AAI Corporation Aerosonde - weather data
 AAI Corporation Aerosonde Mk.1 
 AAI Corporation Aerosonde Mk.2
 AAI Corporation Aerosonde Mk.3
 AAI Corporation Aerosonde Mk.4
 Aerosonde Aeroguard
 ADRO Pelican Observer
 BAE Brumby
 BAE Kingfisher
 BAE STRIX
 Boeing Air Power Teaming System (Boeing MQ-28 Ghost Bat) 
 Carbonix Volanti
 Carbonix Domani
 Coptercam
 Cyber Technology CyberQuad
 Cyber Technology CyberEye
 Cyber Technology CyBird
 Cyber Technology CyberWraith
 Codarra Avatar
 CSIRO Mantis
 GAF Jindivik
 GAF Turana
 Entecho Demipod
 Entecho Mupod
 ADI Jandu
 Silvertone Flamingo
 Skyborne Technologies Cerberus GLH
 Skyborne Technologies Gannet Glide Drone (GGD)
 Sonacom Mirli
 UAV Vision G18 Aeolus
 UAV Vision T21
 UAV Vision T26
 AVT Hammerhead
 V-TOL i-copter Phantom
 V-TOL i-copter Seeker
 V-TOL Mini Warrigal 
 V-TOL Warrigal Explorer
 V-TOL Explore
 V-TOL Arrow
 V-TOL Quadrotor
 V-TOL Octocopter

Austria

 Schiebel Camcopter S-100 - reconnaissance
 Diamond Hero

Azerbaijan

 AZAD (AZAD Systems Co)
 Orbiter-2M

Belarus

 aOrion Helicopter E
 Grif-1
 INDELA-I.N.SKY
 Berkut
 Yastreb
 Sterkh-BM

Belgium

 MBLE Épervier (1969)
 B-Hunter UAV (2002)
 Gatewing X-100 UAV (2010) - surveying and mapping applications^

Brazil

 14-X, a Mach 10 UAV scramjet under development by FAB
 A-20 LTA VANT Commercial UAV of Space Airships.
 Acauã VANT Experimental UAV of the Brazilian Air Force to develop electronic systems for future Brazilian UAVS.
 Aeromot K1AM UAV/Target drone for the Brazilian Navy, based in Northrop KD2R-5 Drone.
 AGPlane UAV of AGX/Aeroalcool.Agricultural and civilian surveillance UAV.
 Arara M1 Small surveillance UAV.
 Arara T1 Small UAV/target of AGX/Aeroalcool for the Brazilian Navy. 
 Avibras Falcão Tactical UAV, Avibras
 Azimute Santos Lab Comercio e Industria Aerospacial Ltda.
 BQM-1BR First Brazilian UAV/target of the CBT (Companhia Brasileira de Tratores). 
 Caçador, developed from Israeli IAI Heron
 Carcara Infantry portable UAV, in service with the Brazilian Marine Corps Santos Lab Comercio e Industria Aerospacial Ltda.
 Carcara II New version of Carcara for the Navy, Santos Lab Comercio e Industria Aerospacial Ltda.
 Dumont - New Technologies,
 Eletron UAV of the BRVANT.
 Flight Technologies FS-01 Watchdog Brazilian Tactical reconnaissance UAV
 Flight Technologies FS-02 AvantVision Brazilian mini UAV
 Flight Technologies FT-100 Horus Soldier portable UAV, in small service in the Brazilian army Flight Technologies based on FS-02	
 Flight Technologies FT-200 Watchdog Brazilian Tactical reconnaissance UAV by Flight Technologies based in FS-01	
 Flight Technologies VT-15 UAV In test of the Brazilian Army, based on Flight Technologies FT-200 Watchdog.	
 Gyro 200 ED mini-UAV Quadcopter of the Gyrofly Innovations.
 Gyro 500 Mini-UAV Quadcopter of the Gyrofly Innovations.
 Harpia This is a medium size tactical UAV of the Harpia Systems (Joint-Venture of the Embraer Defense and Security, AEL Systems and Avibras), halted in January 2016
 Hornet H2 UAV of the BRVANT.
 Jabirú Santos Lab Comercio e Industria Aerospacial Ltda. 
 Proton UAV of the BRVANT.
 SARVant Surveillance UAV developed by a consortium of OrbiSat (SAR Radar) Aeroalcool (airframe) and AGX (flight controls).
 Sea Runner target of the Brazilian Air Force.
 Tiriba Brazilian mini UAV by AGX Tecnologia.4 kg, light civilian UAV
 XMobots Apoema 1000B LALE (low-altitude long-endurance) (2009)

Canada

 Aeryon Scout, reconnaissance (2009)
 Aeryon SkyRanger R60, reconnaissance (2013)
 Aeryon SkyRanger R70, reconnaissance (2017)
 Aeryon SkyRaider R80D, reconnaissance (2017)
 Canadair CL-89, reconnaissance (1964) - joint funded by UK, later by West Germany as well
 CL-289, reconnaissance (1990)
 CL-227 Sentinel, reconnaissance (1977)
 CL-327 Guardian, reconnaissance (1996)
 CH-160, reconnaissance (2009)
 CU-162 Vindicator (2011)
 Draganflyer X4, surveillance (2009)
 Draganflyer X6, surveillance (2009)
 Draganflyer X8, surveillance (2010)
 Draganfly Tango, reconnaissance
 Meggitt Vindicator II (CU-162)
 PrecisionHawk Lancaster, agriculture (2010)
 Prioria Robotics Maveric
 Silver Fox ALIX (Atlantic Littoral Intelligence Surveillance and Reconnaissance Experiment) (2004)
 ADVANCED SUBSONICS/XIPHOS Grasshopper (2000)
 MMIST CQ-10 Snowgoose (2000)

Chile

 Sirol, reconnaissance and research (2007)
 Sirol 221, reconnaissance and meteorology research (2008)
 Stardust II, reconnaissance and aerial imaging(2010)
 Lascar UAV, reconnaissance (2012)

China (PRC)

Colombia

 Navigator X2
 Araknos V2, multirotor. Advector, Unmanned Systems
 Koleopteros, multirotor. Advector, Unmanned Systems
 Buteos LTE, fixed wing. Advector, Unmanned Systems

Costa Rica

 SA-SkyHunter, aerial mapping (2014)

Croatia

 BL M-99 Bojnik

Czech Republic

 Sojka III
 HAES 400, small aerial target (2009)
 Primoco UAV
 ThunderFly TF-G2 autogyro 
 Xyris 6

Denmark

 Danish Aviation Systems: Ebee, Sensefly Albris, Swinglet Cam.
 Sky-Watch: RQ-35 Heidrun EO/IR and mapping.

Finland

 MASS Mini-UAV, reconnaissance

France

 Aérospatiale C.22, target drone
 Altec MART
 ARSAERO CT 10
 CAC K100
 CAC Fox
 Dassault LOGIDUC
 Dassault AVE-D Petit Duc, research (2000)
 Dassault AVE-C Moyen Duc, research (2001)
 Dassault nEUROn, combat (was expected in 2011)
 Dassault-Sagem SlowFast, reconnaissance (2004)
 Donecle drone, autonomous aircraft inspection
 EADS Harfang, reconnaissance (2006)
 EADS Talarion
 Flying-Robots FR102, softs wings based (2008)
 Lehmann Aviation L-A series civilian drones, for high precision mapping, mining/construction, precision agriculture
 Lehmann Aviation L-M series civilian drones, for long-range real-time surveillance
 Nord CT.10 (Arsenal / SFECMAS Ars.5.501)
 Nord CT.20 (Arsenal / SFECMAS T.5.510)
 Nord CT.41
 Parrot AR.Drone
 SAGEM Crecerelle
 SAGEM Patroller
 SAGEM Sperwer, reconnaissance
 Techno-Sud Vigilant
 Verhagen X2 Autonomous Helicopters, flycam reconnaissance (2008)

Georgia

 Unmanned Aerial System

Germany

 Aibotix Aibot X6, multicopter for mapping and industry
 AiDrones AiD-H14, industrial helicopter UAV
 AiDrones AiD-H25, industrial helicopter UAV
 AiDrones AiD-H40, industrial helicopter UAV
 EMT Aladin, reconnaissance
 Argus As 292, anti-aircraft target drone (1937)
 Argus Fernfeuer
 AscTec Falcon 8, industrial octocopter for aerial imaging (UAV)
 AscTec Firefly, hexacopter for research and development (UAV)
 AscTec Hummingbird, quadrocopter for research and development (UAV)
 AscTec Pelican, quadrotor for research and development UAV
 Birdpilot X-4 Multicopter, lightweight long endures industrial quadcopter for aerial imaging (UAV)
 Birdpilot X-8 Multicopter,  compact industrial octocopter for aerial imaging (UAV)
 Dornier Kiebitz
 EADS Barracuda, German-led program together with Spain
 EMT Fancopter, reconnaissance
 EMT Luna, reconnaissance
 EMT Luna NG, reconnaissance
 EMT X-13 
 Fieseler Fi 157 anti-aircraft target drone (1937)
 Globe UAV 6 LTE Hexacopter, compact industrial Copter for aerial imaging (UAV)
 Globe UAV 8 IXON LTE Octocopter, compact industrial Copter for aerial imaging (UAV)
 Globe UAV 4L AQUILA LTE Quadrocopter, compact industrial Copter for aerial imaging (UAV)
 Globe UAV 8L CEPTOR LTE Octocopter, compact industrial Copter for aerial imaging and transport (UAV)
 Globe UAV AVIUM 200 LTE VTOL, compact industrialVTOL for aerial imaging and transport (UAV)
 H-Aero
 Hyfish
 MikroKopter and variants QuadroKopter, HexaKopter and OktoKopter
 EMT Museco, ATOL helicopter, reconnaissance and communication
 OFFIS Guard reconnaissance and research
 EuroHawk, reconnaissance (developed together with the U.S.)
 Sagitta Research Demonstrator, jet powered UAV developed as part of the Open Innovation initiative
 SIRIUS UAS (MAVinci)
 V-1 flying bomb (Vergeltungswaffen V-1 surface to surface, air to surface jet bomb, also known as Fieseler Fi 103)
 Wingcopter 178 Heavy Lift (Delivery Drone).
 Ruhrstahl Kramer X-7 (air to tank, also known as Ruhrstahl Kramer 347)
 Arado Ar E.377 und Ar E.377A (air to ship)
 Henschel Hs 117 (surface to airplane, air to air)
 Henschel Hs 293 (air to ship)
 Henschel Hs 294 (air to ship)
 Henschel Hs 298 (air to air)
 Blohm & Voss BV 143A und BV 143B (air to ship)
 Blohm & Voss BV 246 (air to surface, also known as Blohm & Voss BV 226)
 Blohm & Voss BV 950 L10 und BV 950 L11 (air to ship)
 Messerschmitt Enzian E-4 (surface to airplane)
 Rheinmetall KZO (reconnaissance)

Greece

 Aether Aeronautics ADS
 Aether Aeronautics PNS-1
 Altus LSA Uranos 
 BSK Defense Erevos MALE reconnaissance UAV 
 BSK Defense Ideon mini reconnaissance UAV
 BSK Defense Kyon mini reconnaissance UAV
 BSK Defense Phaethon G tactical reconnaissance UAV 
 BSK Defense Phaethon J tactical reconnaissance UAV
 DELAER RX-3 surveillance and reconnaissance
 EADS 3 Sigma Alkyon
 EADS 3 Sigma Iris
 EADS 3 Sigma Nearchos reconnaissance (1996)
 EADS 3 Sigma Perseas
 EAV (HAI) Archytas (under development)  
 EAV (HAI) Ε1-79 Pegasos reconnaissance (1982)
 EAV (HAI) Ε1-79 Pegasos II reconnaissance (2005)
 HCUAV surveillance UAV (2015)
 IDE Intracom Defence Lotus
 Spirit Aeronautical Systems MALE UAS
 Spirit Aeronautical Systems SARISA SRS-1A armed drone
 UCANDRONE/EFA Archytas VTOL drone (not related to the EAV (HAI) Archytas project)
 UCANDRONE Blackbird
 UCANDRONE F220
 UCANDRONE Phoreas
 Ypaspistis UCAV

India

 DRDO Nishant
 DRDO Abhyas
 DRDO Ghatak (Stealth UCAV under development)
 DRDO Archer 
 India-U.S Joint ALUAV target drone.
 RUAV 200
 Adani Hermes 900 : Adani Groups manufactures Israeli Hermes 900 drones.
 Trinetra UAV
 Hal Cats : Combat Air Teaming System including stealth UAV’s.
 DRDO Rustom & Rustom II
 TAPAS-BH-201
 DRDO Fluffy
 DRDO Imperial Eagle
 DRDO Kapothaka
 DRDO Lakshya
 DRDO Netra
 DRDO Nishant
 DRDO Ulka
 IAI-HAL NRUAV
 Maraal
 NAL / ADE Black Kite
 NAL / ADE Golden Hawk
 NAL / ADE Pushpak
 NAL Slybird
 Pawan UAV
ZMotion TRINETRA
SWITCH UAV
Raphe mPhibr Nistaar
 MagnumWings Viper

Indonesia

 PUNA Wulung (Pesawat Udara Nir-Awak, Made by BPP Teknologi)
 LSU-02 (Lapan Surveillance UAV-02, Made by Lapan)
 LSU-03 (Lapan Surveillance UAV-03, Made by Lapan)
 Elang Hitam (IAe Male UAV, Made by PT IAe - 2020)
 LTD (Large Target Drone, Made by PT Mandiri Mitra Muhibbah - 2006)

International

 BGAC develops drones in China on helicopters & aircraft imported from USA, EU & CIS
 Dassault nEUROn (France/Sweden/Switzerland/Greece/Italy/Spain)
 EADS Barracuda (Spain/Germany)
 EADS Talarion
 IAI-HAL NRUAV
 Singular Aircraft SA03 (UK/Spain)

Iran

List of Iranian drone bases

 Gaza
 HESA Ababil
 Hemaseh
IAIO Fotros
 Karrar
 Mobin
 Pars robot
 Qods Mohajer
 Qods Saeghe
 Sarir
 Shahbal
 Shahed 121
 Shahed 123
 Shahed 125
 Shahed 129
 Shahed 136
 Shahed 141
 Shahed 149
 Shahed 161
 Shahed 171
 Shahed 191
 Shahed 197
 Sofreh Mahi
 Saegheh
 Talash
 Yasir UAV
 Zohal

Israel

 Top I Vision Casper 250
 Silver Arrow Micro-V
 Silver Arrow Sniper
 IAI Skylark – Canister Launched mini-UAV system
 IAI Scout
 IAI General
 IAI Harpy
 IAI Harop
 IAI I-View
 IAI Panther
 IAI Ranger (with Switzerland)
 IAI Heron
 IAI Eitan
 AAI RQ-2 Pioneer (with USA)
 AAI RQ-7 Shadow
 IAI Bird-Eye
 Elbit Skylark
 Elbit Hermes 90
 Elbit Hermes 450
 Elbit Hermes 900
 Aeronautics Defense Dominator
 Aeronautics Defense Orbiter
 Tactical Robotics Cormorant
 Tadiran Mastiff
 Urban Aeronautics X-Hawk

Italy

 Meteor, now SELEX Galileo Avionica Mirach series (Mirach 26, Mirach 150), target drone and reconnaissance variants
 SELEX Galileo Avionica NIBBIO, tactical reconnaissance
 SELEX Galileo Avionica FALCO, reconnaissance
 Alenia Aeronautica Sky-x, research UCAV (2005)
 Alenia Aeronautica Sky-y, research-reconnaissance MALE (2007)
 Alenia Aeronautica Molynx/Black Lynx, reconnaissance HALE (in development)
 Alenia Aeronautica ITV
 Mirach 26
 Mirach 150
 Nimbus EosXi, Unmanned Aerial Vehicle in Hybrid airship configuration
 Piaggio P.1HH HammerHead
 Selex ES Falco

Japan

 Fuji HK-2B
 Kawasaki KAQ-1, target
 Yamaha R-MAX, industrial
 Kawasaki Ki-147 I-Go-1A (air to surface)
 Mitsubishi Ki-148 I-Go-1B (air to surface)

Jordan

 Jordan Falcon

Latvia

 UAVFACTORY Penguin B dual-purpose (civil/military), fixed-wing UAV (2010)
 FIXAR: FIXAR 007 (civilian), fixed-wing vertical take-off and landing UAV

Malaysia

 Eagle ARV System
 CTRM Aludra

Mexico

 S4 Ehécatl by Hydra Technologies
 E1 Gavilán by Hydra Technologies

Netherlands

 Aviolanda AT-21
 Avy Aera
 High Eye HE60, Cam helicopter
 High Eye Airboxer
 Verhagen X2
 Geocopter B.V.
 Mine Kafon Drone

New Zealand

 KAHU-HAWK
 RQ-84 AreoHawk Hawkeye UAV 
 Hawkeye Systems Hawk GS-500
 X-craft Enterprises Valkyrie
 X-craft EnterpriseS Angelray

Nigeria

 Tsaigumi UAV

Norway

 Aerobot Canard, developed by Robot Aviation
 SkyRobot FX20, developed by Robot Aviation
 SkyRobot FX450, developed by Robot Aviation
 Black Hornet Nano., developed by Prox Dynamics

North Korea

 Domestically produced Chinese Sky-09P developed through North Korea's UAV program 2005-2014

Pakistan

 

 Albadeey Technologies Ababeel III — (Target Drone) 
 Albadeey Technologies Hud-Hud III — (Medium Range Drone) 
 GIDS HUMA — (Remote Sensing Drone)
 GIDS Shahpar — (Reconnaissance Drone), Pakistan Air Force & Pakistan Army has inducted.
 GIDS Shahpar-2
 GIDS Uqab — (Real Time Reconnaissance Drone), Pakistan Army has inducted.
 GIDS Uqab-II — (Naval Variant of the Uqab), Pakistan Navy has inducted first squadron.
 Integrated Dynamics Border Eagle — (Surveillance Drone) 
 Integrated Dynamics Explorer — (Civilian Drone) 
 Integrated Dynamics Hawk MK-V — (Surveillance Drone) 
 Integrated Dynamics Hornet — (Surveillance Drone) 
 Integrated Dynamics Hummer — (Multicopter Drone)
 Integrated Dynamics Nishan MK-II and TJ-1000 — (High-Speed Target Drone) 
  Integrated Dynamics Rover MK-I & XS — (Civilian Scientific Data Gatherer Drone) 
 Integrated Dynamics Shadow MK-II — (Surveillance Drone) 
 Integrated Dynamics Tornado — (Decoy Drone) 
 Integrated Dynamics Vector — (Surveillance Drone) 
 Integrated Dynamics Vision MK-I and Mk-II — (Surveillance Drone) 
 NESCOM Burraq — (Combat Drone), Pakistan Air Force & Pakistan Army has inducted.
 PAC Ababeel — (Small Scale Target Drone) 
 PAC Baaz — (Large Scale Target Drone) 
 PAC Falco — (Version of Italian Selex ES Falco drone built under license), Pakistan Air Force has inducted.
 SATUMA Flamingo —  (Medium Range Reconnaissance Drone) 
 SATUMA FST — (Full Scale Trainer Drone) 
 SATUMA HST-Parwaz — (Half Scale Trainer Drone) 
 SATUMA Jasoos I & Jasoos II Bravo+ — (Reconnaissance Drone), Pakistan Air Force has inducted.
 SATUMA Mukhbar — (Short Range Reconnaissance Drone) 
 SATUMA Thunder SR and LR — (High Speed Target Drone) 
 Sysverve Aerospace SAAD-1M Target Drone 
 Sysverve Aerospace Hadaf-1 Target Drone 
 Sysverve Aerospace Hadaf-2 Target Drone
 Sysverve Aerospace Ababeel FPV Target Drone 
 Sysverve Aerospace Ababeel X Target Drone 
 Sysverve Aerospace Shahab VTOL (Surveillance Drone)
 Sysverve Aerospace Shahab UCAV (Unmanned Combat Aerial Vehicle)
 Sysverve Aerospace Pasban QUAD-X EVTOL (Surveillance Drone)
 Sysverve Aerospace Black Arrow Tow Drone 
 Sysverve Aerospace AeD Tow Target 
 Sysverve Aerospace Mudabir Alpha (Loitering Munition)

Peru

 CEDEP-1
 UAV FAP

Philippines

 Knight Falcon
 Raptor
 TUAV

Poland

 Pteryx UAV
 HOB-bit
 SKNL PRz PR5 Wiewiór plus - (Studenckie Koło Naukowe Lotników, Politechnika Rzeszowska - SKNL PRz)
 Flytronic UAV FlyEye
 Flytronic UAV Tarkus

Portugal

 ANTEX-M
 Beyond Vision HEIFU
 Beyond Vision HEIFU PRO
 Beyond Vision VTOne
 Harpia Tech Vigilant
 Harpia Tech H24 Cruzer
 Harpia Tech No Brand
 QuadCopter UX-4001 Mini
 QuadCopter UX-401
 OctoCopter UX-801
 Tekever AR1
 Tekever AR3
 Tekever AR4
 Tekever AR5
 PAIC Império SP1
 UAVision OGASSA OGS42
 UAVision OGASSA OGS42V
 UAVision UX SPYRO
 UAVision WINGO
 UAVision WINGO S

Romania

 Air Strato
 Argus S - surveillance (2005)
 Argus XL - reconnaissance (2007)
 ATT-01 - target drone
 Hirrus - surveillance (2018)
 IAR-T - research, target and surveillance (1997)
 Quarrus - target drone
 SACT Boreal 5

Russia

Aist ("Stork") — multirole UAV
Altius-RU — medium-altitude long-endurance reconnaissance and combat UAV
Chirok — hybrid amphibious UAV vehicle
Dozor-3 — heavy reconnaissance and combat UAV (2009)
Dozor-50 — intelligence, surveillance (2007)
Dozor-85 — aerial mapping, border patrol, surveillance
Dozor-100 — intelligence, surveillance, reconnaissance unmanned aircraft system (2009)
Dozor-600 — reconnaissance and combat UAV (late-2010)
Eleron-3 — reconnaissance UAV
ENICS E-95 / E08M - target drone
Forpost — licensed copy of the Israel UAV Searcher MkII, Forpost-R is localized version
Geoscan Lite — fixed-wing aerial survey UAV 
Geoscan 201 — fixed-wing aerial survey UAV with GNSS receiver and multispectral camera 
Geoscan 401 — multirotor drone with variable payload 
Geoscan 501 — multirotor aerial survey drone 
Kamov Ka-137 / MBVK-137 — multipurpose unmanned helicopter complex (1998)
Kuznetsov Pustelga — mobile complexes (MC) based on autonomously piloted flying microvehicles (FMV). Three types:  Alpha (31 lb), Beta (15 lb), Gamma (10 lb)
Kronstadt Grom — stealthy unmanned combat aerial vehicle, equivalent as XQ-58
Kronstadt Molnya — smaller similar to Grom
Kronstadt Orion - medium altitude long-range reconnaissance and combat UAV, comparable to RQ1, RQ3 and RQ9
Lavochkin La-17, target and reconnaissance UAV (1953)
Luch (Design Bureau), Korsar — medium-weight reconnaissance and combat UAV
Luch (Design Bureau), Lastochka — light-weight reconnaissance and combat UAV (2011)
Luch (Design Bureau), Luch — medium-range reconnaissance and combat UAV
Mikoyan Skat — stealth reconnaissance and combat UAV
Radar-MMS BPV-500
STC Orlan-10 - light-weight reconnaissance UAV, artillery spotter
Sukhoi Zond-1 (UAV) AWACS station for intelligence, surveillance and interception project
Sukhoi S-70 Okhotnik-B (Hunter), close to Skat and BAE and US UCAVs  stealth UCAV unveiled in 2017.
T-4 Iskatel (Searcher) — high-tech reconnaissance portable UAV (2012)
Tupolev Tu-123 — reconnaissance (1964)
Tupolev Tu-141 — reconnaissance (mid-1970s)
Tupolev Tu-143 — reconnaissance (1970s onward)
Tupolev Ту-243 Reis-D — Unmanned tactical aerial reconnaissance, operational as of 2000
Yakovlev ALBATROS-EXPERT — vertical start and landing remote-piloted vehicle (RPV) intended for television (infra-red vision) air reconnaissance of the underlying surface in the day-time and at night, EXPERT is the integrated system comprising three RPV, ground control station, launcher and servicing equipment.
Yakovlev Klest — reconnaissance UAV to replace the Russian armed forces' Pchela-1s.
Yakovlev Pchela-1T — reconnaissance UAV (1986)
Yakovlev Voron "raven" — UCAV for long range, high speed strike capability
ZALA 421-06
ZALA 421-08, reconnaissance mini UAV (2007)
ZALA 421-12

Saudi Arabia

 Saqr 1
 Saqr 2
 Saqr 3
 Saqr 4
 PSATRI UAV

Serbia

 Nikola Tesla-150 - First Serbian Student unmanned aerial vehicle built by a team of students called "EMA"
 Vrabac UAV
 Pegaz 011 (development)
 Rapier Unmanned Helicopter with weapons (development)
 Kobac Reconnaissance
 OSA ( WASP) VTOL UAV -  Student unmanned aerial vehicle built by a team of students called "BEOAVIA"

Singapore

 ST Aero FanTail
 ST Aero MAV-1
 ST Aero Skyblade

Slovenia

 C-Astral Aerospace Bramor ppX
 C-Astral Aerospace Bramor C4EYE ISR UAV - NATO Class I <150 kg Mini Tactical RPAS
 C-Astral Aerospace Bramor sAR
 C-Astral Aerospace Atlas C4EYE ISR UAV - NATO Class I <150 kg Mini Tactical RPAS
 C-Astral Aerospace SQA eVTOL ISR UAV

South Africa

 Denel Dynamics Seeker - Tactical reconnaissance (a light air-to-ground missile is under development for it)
 Denel Dynamics Skua - Target drone
 ATE Vulture - Artillery spotting/targeting UAV
 Denel Dynamics Bateleur - MALE reconnaissance/elint UAV

South Korea

 Korea Aerospace Night Intruder NI-100N or DUV-4, medium-range tactical reconnaissance
 Korea Aerospace RQ-101, short-range for tactical reconnaissance
 Korea Aerospace RQ-102, short-range for tactical reconnaissance, target detection and target designation and combat damage assessment
 Korea Aerospace Night Intruder 600VT,  VTOL (Vertical Takeoff and Landing) unmanned helicopter for reconnaissance missions
 Korean Air Aerospace KUS-7
 Korean Air Aerospace KUS-9 medium-range tactical reconnaissance
 Korean Air Aerospace KUS-FS MALE, medium-altitude, long-endurance (MALE) UAV
 Korean Air Aerospace KUS-VH, Unmanned System-Vertical Helicopter
 Korean Air Aerospace KUS-FC, unmanned combat air vehicle [UCAV] with stealth capacities
 Uconsystem Remo Eye 006B
 Uconsystem Remo Eye 002B
 Uconsystem T-Rotor
 Uconsystem Drone Killer
 LIG Nex1 KCD-200 heavy-lift UAV

Spain

 Aerial Target Light (Low Cost Target Drone)
 Aurea Avionics Seeker UAS
 CONYCA GEODRONE
 Quaternium HYBRiX.20
 Alpha Unmanned Systems SNIPER
 Aerovision Fulmar
 SIVA (Artillery Observer Plane)
 EADS Barracuda (with Germany)
 SCRAB II (Twin Turbine Target Drone)
 SCRAB I (High Portable Turbine Target Drone)
 SCR ALBA (Light and Portable Target Drone)

Sri Lanka

 Lihiniya MK I
 Lihiniya MK II

Switzerland

 Aeroscout Scout B1-100
 KZD-85
 RUAG Ranger
 Swiss UAV NEO S-300

Sweden

 SHARC
 Saab Skeldar
 CybAero APID 55

Taiwan

 NCSIST Albatross
 NCSIST Cardinal I
 NCSIST Cardinal II
 NCSIST Fire Cardinal
 NCSIST Chien Hsiang
 NCSIST Teng Yun

Thailand

 Aerostar (with Israel)
 AeroVironment RQ-11 Raven (with US)
 Black Kite UAV
 IAI Searcher (with Israel)
 D eyes-04 (with Thai)
 D eyes-03 (with Thai)
 D eyes-02 (with Thai)
 D eyes-01 (with Thai)
 UAV-RD01
 Sky Scout-X ucav
 RTAF-U1M uas
 MARCUS (SDT Composites/Naval Research & Development Office)

Tunisia

 TATI Nasnas MK1

Turkey

 ASİSGUARD SARGUT
 Asisguard Songar  
 Aselsan ARI-1T rotary-wing 
 Atlantis AeroSeeker 405
 Bayraktar Akıncı, UCAV under development
 Bayraktar Mini UAV (Reconnaissance)
 Bayraktar Kızılelma (UCAV under development)
 Bayraktar Tactical UAV (Reconnaissance and surveillance)
 Bayraktar TB2 UCAV
 Bayraktar TB3 UCAV
 Bayraktar VTOL
 Baykar Malazgirt Mini VTOL (Reconnaissance and surveillance)
 UAVERA Çağatay CGT50 VTOL UAS used by General Directorate of Security (Turkey)
 Globiha Mini UAV
 Havelsan BAHA
 LAPİS ULAK VTL 02 - VTOL Armed UAV integrated with TUBITAK-SAGE TOGAN - Air-to-surface launched 81 mm mortar munition
 Otonom Teknoloji Doruk-101A Aerostat System
 Poyraz (Intelligent and Country Security Drone)
 SE Defense and Aviation Albatross VTOL UAV
 TAI Aksungur
 TAI Göksungur
 TAI Anka-A (MALE) UAV
 TAI Anka-B (MALE) UCAV
 TAI Baykuş
 TAI Gözcü (Short-range tactical reconnaissance, surveillance, target acquisition)
 TAI Keklik
 TAI Martı
 TAI Pelikan (Reconnaissance, surveillance, target acquisition)
 TAI R-300 R-İHA UAV
 TAI Şimşek (Turbojet powered, high-speed aerial target drone, threat simulator)
 TAI Sivrisinek R-İHA UAV
 TAI Turna-G (Turboprop powered, medium-speed target drone)
 Vestel Arı
 Vestel Efe
 Vestel Ege
 Vestel Karayel (Tactical UAV/UCAV)

Ukraine

 A1-CM Furia
 Horlytsia
 Leleka-100
 PD-1
 PD-2
 R18
 RAM and RAM II UAV loitering munitions (based on the Leleka-100)
 Sokil-300
 ACE One (Stealth UCAV)
 Shark (UAV)
 Raybird-3

United Arab Emirates

 Adcom Systems Yabhon
 Yabhon United 40

 Adasi Air Truck
 Adasi Al Sabr S-100
 Adasi Garmoosha
 Adasi Hunter 10
 Adasi Hunter 2-S
 Adasi Hunter 5
 Adasi Hunter SP
 Adasi Jenia
 Adasi QX-4 VTOL
 Adasi QX-5 VTOL
 Adasi QX-6 VTOL
 Adasi QX6-50
 Adasi Rash S
 Adasi SDO 50 V2 VTOL
 Halcon Shadow 25
 Halcon Shadow 50-P
 Halcon Shadow 50-TJ

United Kingdom

 Aesir Hoder
 Airspeed Queen Wasp (1936)
 ArduCopter
 BAE Systems Ampersand, reconnaissance (2008)
 BAE Systems Corax, research (2004)
 BAE Systems Fury, reconnaissance/attack (2008)
 BAE Systems GA22
 BAE Systems HERTI, reconnaissance (2004)
 BAE Systems Mantis, research, (planned)
 BAE Systems Skylynx II, reconnaissance (2006)
 BAE Systems Taranis, research (planned)
 BAE Systems Magma, blown air research platform.
 BAE Systems Demon, based on a BAE Eclipse drone
 BAE Systems Phoenix, reconnaissance (1986)
 BAE Systems PHASA-35
 de Havilland Queen Bee (1930s) - gunnery target
 English Electric Canberra U Mk.10
 Fairey Queen (1930s) - gunnery target
 Gem-7, medium weight, long endurance UAV.
 Gloster Meteor, U Mk.15, U Mk.16 and U Mk.21 - conversion to target drone
 Meggitt Banshee, formerly Target Technology Ltd Banshee - target drone, and reconnaissance (1984)
 Miles Queen Martinet (1940s)
 ML Aviation Pilotless Target (1950s) - to MoS specification U120D, using the motorcycle-derived Vincent Picador engine.
 ML Aviation Sprite (1981) - "Surveillance Patrol Reconnaissance Intelligence Target Designation Electronic Warfare "
 Novel Air Concept, research, (under construction)
 Prioria Robotics Maveric
 QinetiQ Mercator, research (in development)
 QinetiQ Zephyr, high-altitude long-endurance (in development)
 RAE LARYNX (1927–1929) - guided anti-ship weapon
 R.F.C. 1917 Aerial Target The first drone aircraft
 Short Skyspy - ducted fan for urban reconnaissance
 Singular Aircraft SA03 (UK/Spain)
 Thales Watchkeeper WK450, reconnaissance (2005)
 UB.109T (1950s) - project for long range unpiloted bomb
 UTSL MSAT-500 NG drone for range practise, missile and gunnery. In service (1995).
 Westland Mote - experimental unmanned observation helicopter 1975
 Westland Wisp -  experimental unmanned coaxial helicopter for urban reconnaissance 1976
 Westland Wideye -  experimental unmanned observation helicopter 1977

United States

 AAI RQ-2 Pioneer, reconnaissance (1986)
 AAI RQ-7 Shadow, reconnaissance (1999)
 AIRS Seeker Wing
 Aerojet General MQM-58 Overseer
 Aerojet AN/USD-2
 Aerojet SD-2
 Aero Telemetry H-1 Racer, Commercial, medium endurance, for Hollywood Film Use (2003)
 Aero Telemetry XF-11, Commercial, medium endurance, for Hollywood Film Use (2003)
 Aero Telemetry H-4 Hercules, Commercial for Hollywood Film Use (2003)
 AeroVironment FQM-151 Pointer
 AeroVironment RQ-11 Raven, reconnaissance (2005)
 AeroVironment RQ-14 Dragon Eye, reconnaissance (2002)
 AeroVironment RQ-20 Puma, reconnaissance (2007)
 AeroVironment Nano Hummingbird
 AeroVironment SkyTote
 AeroVironment Switchblade
 AeroVironment Wasp III, reconnaissance (2001)
 Alliant RQ-6 Outrider, reconnaissance (1996)
 American Dynamics AD-150, reconnaissance, attack
 Applied Aeronautics Albatross UAV
 AQM-127 SLAT
 AQM-128
 Arcturus T-20, reconnaissance, attack (2009)
 ASSET (spacecraft)
 ATAIR Insect
 ATAIR LEAPP
 ATAIR Micro LEAPP
 AutoCopter
 AUM-N-2 Petrel
 Aurora Goldeneye
 Aurora Flight Sciences Orion
 BAE Systems Silver Fox
 BAE Systems SkyEye (with the United Kingdom), reconnaissance (1973)
 BAE Systems Skylynx II
 BAI BQM-147 Dragon reconnaissance (1986)
 Beechcraft AQM-37A
 Beechcraft Model 1019 Designated AQM-37A by the United States Military
 Beechcraft Model 1025 Cardinal
 Beechcraft Model Model 1072 United Kingdom variant, modified by Short Brothers as the Short Stiletto to meet British requirements.
 Beechcraft Model Model 1088 Italian variant
 Beechcraft Model Model 1094
 Beechcraft KD2B-1
 Beechcraft Q-12
 Beechcraft AQM-37 Jayhawk, target (1961)
 Beechcraft MQM-61 Cardinal
 Beechcraft MQM-61A Cardinal, target (1959)
 Beechcraft MQM-107 Streaker (1974)
 Bell Eagle Eye, tiltrotor reconnaissance (1998) (cancelled)
 Boeing A160 Hummingbird, research (2005)
 Boeing CQM-121 Pave Tiger, anti-radar drone (1983)
 Boeing Condor, reconnaissance (1988)
 Boeing Dominator, experimental (2007) -Persistent Munition Technology Demonstrator-
 Boeing HALE Under development
 Boeing Insitu RQ-21 Blackjack
 Boeing Phantom Eye, reconnaissance (2011)
 Boeing Phantom Ray
 Boeing Insitu ScanEagle, reconnaissance (2004)
 Boeing SolarEagle
 Boeing X-37
 Boeing X-45, research (2002)
 Boeing X-46, research (2003)
 Boeing X-48
 Boeing X-50, research (2003)
 Boeing X-51
 Boeing YQM-94A Compass Cope B, reconnaissance (1973)
 BQM-90, target (1970)
 Brunswick-Balke-Collender OQ-4
 Chance-Vought KD2U-1 Regulus II
 Composite Engineering BQM-167 Streaker, in development (2006)
 Composite Engineering MQM-107 Streaker
 Cornelius XBG-3
 Culver PQ-8
 Culver PQ-10
 Culver PQ-14 Cadet
 Culver XPQ-15
 Culver Q-8
 Culver TDC
 Culver TD2C
 Culver TD3C
 Culver Model V, TD4C
 Curtiss KD2C Skeet
 Cyber Defence CyberScout 
 DARPA-USN Tactically Exploited Reconnaissance Node ISR UAV
 DARPA Vulture, under development
 DRS RQ-15 Neptune, naval reconnaissance (2002)
 DRS Sentry HP
 DSI/NASA Oblique Wing RPV
 Excalibur unmanned aerial vehicle
 Fairchild SM-73 Bull Goose (WS-123A Goose) 
 Facebook Aquila
 Fairchild BQ-3
 Fairchild SD-5 Osprey
 Fleetwings BQ-1
 Fleetwings BQ-2
 Fleetwings PQ-12
 Fletcher FBT-2
 Freefly Systems ALTA, aerial cinematography
 Freewing Scorpion
 GQM-163 Coyote
 General Atomics ALTUS, research (1996)
 General Atomics Avenger, reconnaissance, attack (2009)
 General Atomics Gnat-750, reconnaissance (1989)
 General Atomics MQ-1 Predator
 General Atomics MQ-1C Grey Eagle, air attack (2009)
 General Atomics MQ-9 Reaper, reconnaissance, air attack (2006)
 General Atomics RQ-1 Predator, reconnaissance, combat (1995)
 Global Observer Under development
 Globe KD2G Firefly, target (1946)
 Globe KD4G Quail, target (1949)
 Globe KD5G, target (1949)
 Globe KD6G Firefly, target (1951)
 Globe KDG Snipe, target (1946)
 Gorgon (missile family)
 Griffon Outlaw
 Griffon Outlaw G2
 Griffon Outlaw Seahunter
 Guardian UAV 
 Gyrodyne QH-50 DASH or Drone Anti-Submarine Helicopter
 Hewitt-Sperry Automatic Airplane, weapon (1917)
 Honeywell RQ-16 T-Hawk, reconnaissance (2006)
 IAI RQ-5 Hunter, reconnaissance (1999)
 Imaging 1 micro UAV
 Insectothopter
 Interstate TDR
 Interstate XBDR
 Insitu Aerosonde
 KQ-X
 Kettering Bug, weapon (1918)
 Kratos XQ-58 Valkyrie
 Lethal Miniature Aerial Missile System
 Lockheed AQM-60 Kingfisher
 Lockheed D-21, reconnaissance (1964)
 Lockheed X-7
 Lockheed Martin Desert Hawk, reconnaissance (2001)
 Lockheed Martin Desert Hawk III
 Lockheed Martin MPUAV Cormorant (cancelled)
 Lockheed Martin P-175 Polecat, research (2006)
 Lockheed Martin RQ-170 Sentinel, reconnaissance (2009)
 Lockheed Martin RQ-3 DarkStar, research (1996)
 Lockheed Martin Sea Ghost
 Lockheed Martin Stalker
 Lockheed Martin X-44 (UAV)
 Lockheed Martin X-56
 Lockheed MQM-105 Aquila experimental Lockheed UAV, early 1980s
 Lockheed Aequare
 LTV XQM-93
 MA-31
 Marcus UAV Devil Ray
 Martin X-23 PRIME
 Martin Marietta Model 845
 McDonnell KDD, TD2D Katydid
 McDonnell KSD Gargoyle
 McDonnell ADM-20 Quail, decoy (1958)
 McDonnell Douglas X-36
 MMIST CQ-10 Snowgoose, cargo (2005)
 MQ-25 Stingray
 MTC MQ-17 SpyHawk
 Nano Hummingbird, surveillance and reconnaissance (2011)
 NASA Advanced Soaring Concepts Apex research (cancelled before first flight, 1999)
 NASA Centurion
 NASA GL-10 Greased Lightning
 NASA Helios
 NASA Hyper III
 NASA Mini-Sniffer, research (1975 to 1982)
 NASA Pathfinder, research (2001)
NASA Mars Helicopter Ingenuity, a mini-helicopter to scout routes for the Perseverance rover on Mars
 Naval Aircraft Factory TDN
 Naval Research Laboratory Flyrt
 North American X-10, research (1953)
 North American MQM-42 Redhead-Roadrunner
 Northrop RP-71
 Northrop RP-76
 Northrop AQM-35, target (1956)
 Northrop AQM-38, target (1959)
 Northrop BQM-74A Chukar, target, decoy (1964)
 Northrop GAM-67 Crossbow, multi-role (1956)
 Northrop MQM-74A Chukar, target, decoy (1964)
 Northrop Grumman MQ-8 Fire Scout, reconnaissance (2000)
 Northrop Grumman MQ-8C Fire Scout
 Northrop Grumman RQ-4 Global Hawk, reconnaissance (2001)
 Northrop Grumman RQ-180, intelligence, surveillance and reconnaissance (2013)
 Northrop Grumman Tactically Exploited Reconnaissance Node ISR UAV
 Northrop Grumman X-47A Pegasus, research (2003)
 Northrop Grumman X-47B flight proven prototype (2013)
 Northrop Grumman X-47C
 Northrop MQM-74A Chukar, target, decoy (1964)
 Northrop XBQM-108
 Northrop NV-144
 Northrop Grumman Bat
 Northrop Grumman Firebird
 Northrop Grumman Switchblade, proposed
 NSRDC BQM-108
 Octatron SkySeer
 Oregon Iron Works Sea Scout
 Piccolissimo
 Piper LBP
 Pratt-Read LBE
 Prioria Robotics Maveric
 Propulsive Wing, high lift, large cargo-carrying, cross-flow fan propulsion (2008)
 Radioplane TDD-1, target (1939)
 Radioplane OQ-1
 Radioplane OQ-2
 Radioplane OQ-3
 Radioplane OQ-6
 Radioplane OQ-7
 Radioplane OQ-13
 Radioplane OQ-14
 Radioplane OQ-17
 Radioplane OQ-19
 Radioplane Q-1
 Radioplane Q-3
 Radioplane RP-1
 Radioplane RP-2
 Radioplane RP-3
 Radioplane RP-4
 Radioplane RP-5
 Radioplane RP-70
 Radioplane RP-71 Falconer
 Radioplane RP-76
 Radioplane RP-77
 Radioplane RP-78
 Radioplane RP-86
 Radioplane Dennymite
 Radioplane XKD4R
 Radioplane MQM-33
 Radioplane MQM-36 Shelduck
 Radioplane AQM-38
 Radioplane MQM-57 Falconer
 Radioplane KD2R Quail
 Radioplane BTT
 Republic SD-3 Snooper
 Republic SD-4 Swallow
 Resolute Eagle, reconnaissance (2016)
 RoboSeed Nano
 Rockwell HiMAT. research, (1979)
 Ryan AQM-34 Firebee, target (1951)
 Ryan AQM-81A Firebolt, target (1983)
 Ryan AQM-91 Firefly, reconnaissance (1968)
 Ryan BQM-34 Firebee, target (1951)
 Ryan YQM-98
 Ryan Model 147 Lightning Bug, reconnaissance (1962)
 Ryan Q-2
 Ryan KDA
 Ryan YQM-98A Compass Cope R, reconnaissance (1974)
 S-TEC Sentry, reconnaissance (1986)
 Sikorsky Cypher, research, (1992)
 Simmonds Aerocessories OQ-11
 Sea Robin XFC
 Sky Sentinel
 Sonex Aircraft Teros
 Swift Engineering, Swift020/021(スウィフト020/021)（2016）
 Systems Integration Evaluation Remote Research Aircraft (SIERRA), research (2009)
 Taylorcraft LBT
 TechJect Dragonfly UAV
 Teledyne Ryan 410
 Teledyne Ryan BQM-145 Peregrine, reconnaissance (1992)
 Teledyne Ryan Scarab
 Temco XKDT Teal, target (1957)
 Unmanned Aeronautics GhostRay, reconnaissance (2016)
 Unmanned Aeronautics XRay, (2016)
 V-Bat
 Vector P
 Vera Tech Phantom Sentinel
 Wingtra WingtraOne
 XGAM-71 Buck Duck
 XSM-74
 Xtreme Drones Velocicopter DELTA, QUAD, HEX, (SUAV) Mult-rotor (2012)
 Northrop JB-1 Jet bomb (surface to surface)
 Northrop JB-10 Buzz bomb (surface to surface)
 Aeronca GB-1, GB-2, GB-3, GB-4, GB-5, GB-6, GB-7, GB-8, GB-9, GB-10, GB-11, GB-12, GB-13, GB-14 and GB-15 (air to surface)
 Aeronca GT-1 (air to ship)
 WFEL JB-4 (surface to surface, air to surface)
 Zephyr Systems ARK-350
 Zephyr Systems OKO-250
 Zephyr Systems Malachi
 Zephyr Systems Titus
 Zipline (delivery drone)
List of United States drone bases

Vietnam

 ITAD M-400
 AV.UAV.s1
 AV.UAV.s2
 AV.UAV.s3
 AV.UAV.s4
 AV.UAV.Ms1
 VT-Patrol

See also

 Loitering munition
 Unmanned combat aerial vehicle

References

Further reading

External links

Military lists
Robotics lists
Unmanned aerial vehicles
Lists of aircraft by design configuration